Akram Omar Moghrabi (born 19 October 1985) is a Lebanese professional footballer who plays as a forward for  club Sagesse.

Club career
Moghrabi signed for Nejmeh's youth sector on 11 September 2002. On 23 July 2012 I-League club Churchill Brothers signed Moghrabi on a one-year deal. On 11 October 2012, he scored a hat-trick against ONGC. On 4 January 2013, he scored a brace against Shillong Lajong in a 6–0 win.

On 5 September 2020, Moghrabi joined Lebanese Premier League club Safa. He scored a hat-trick on 3 January 2021, in a 5–0 win over Salam Zgharta in the league. On 22 May 2021, Moghrabi moved to Bourj.

On 4 July 2022, Moghrabi moved to Sagesse, alongside Bourj teammate Abou Bakr Al-Mel.

Career statistics

International
Scores and results list Lebanon's goal tally first, score column indicates score after each Moghrabi goal.

Honours 
Nejmeh
 Lebanese Premier League: 2008–09, 2013–14
 Lebanese FA Cup: 2015–16
 Lebanese Elite Cup: 2014, 2016, 2017
 Lebanese Super Cup: 2014, 2016

Churchill Brothers
 I-League: 2012–13

Tripoli
 Lebanese FA Cup: 2014–15

Ahed
 AFC Cup: 2019
 Lebanese Premier League: 2018–19
 Lebanese FA Cup: 2018–19
 Lebanese Super Cup: 2018

Bourj
 Lebanese Challenge Cup: 2021

Individual
 Lebanese Premier League Team of the Season: 2016–17

References

External links 

 
 
 

1985 births
Living people
Sportspeople from Tripoli, Lebanon
Association football forwards
Lebanese footballers
Nejmeh SC players
Churchill Brothers FC Goa players
AC Tripoli players
Mohun Bagan AC players
Al Ahed FC players
Safa SC players
Bourj FC players
Sagesse SC footballers
Lebanese Premier League players
I-League players
Lebanon youth international footballers
Lebanon international footballers
Lebanese expatriate footballers
Lebanese expatriate sportspeople in India
Expatriate footballers in India